Dead Girl Walking is the nineteenth novel written by Christopher Brookmyre, and the sixth featuring journalist Jack Parlabane, the writer's most used character.

The novel was released in the United Kingdom on 22 January 2015.

Plot

Jack Parlabane is asked to locate Heike Gunn, the lead singer of the band Savage Earth Heart. Parlabane searches for Gunn throughout Europe's capitals and remote regions of the Scottish islands.

References

2015 British novels
Scottish crime novels
Novels by Christopher Brookmyre
Novels set in Milan
Novels set in Berlin
Novels set in Barcelona
Little, Brown and Company books